Luyendyk may refer to:

Arie Luyendyk (born 1953), Dutch racing driver
Arie Luyendyk Jr. (born 1981), son of the above and also a racing driver
Luyendyk Racing, racing team owned by Luyendyk Sr. for which Luyendyk Jr. raced in the 2006 Indianapolis 500
Bruce P. Luyendyk (born 1943), American geophysicist
Mount Luyendyk, mountain in Antarctica named for the above

See also